Romance of Paris (French: Romance de Paris) is a 1941 French musical film directed by Jean Boyer and starring Charles Trenet, Jean Tissier and Yvette Lebon. The film was shot at the Francoeur Studios in Paris. It was produced and distributed by Pathé.

Synopsis
Georges Gauthier is the son of a singer who made his mother unhappy and then abandoned them. Because of this she raises him away from the world of entertainment, but it is his blood and her performs in the cafes of Paris in the evenings under an assumed name. He keeps this a secret from both his mother and his fiancee.

Cast
 Charles Trenet as Georges Gauthier
 Jean Tissier as 	Jules
 Yvette Lebon as 	Jeannette
 Sylvie as Madame Gauthier
 Jacqueline Porel as 	Madeleine
 Germaine Lix as 	Madame Lourmel		
 Robert Le Vigan as 	Monsieur Lormel 
 Fred Pasquali as Nicolas, l'imprésario 
 Maurice Teynac as Maurice
 Albert Broquin as 	Le régisseur
 André Alerme as 	Cartier, le directeur 
 Georges Bever as L'accordéoniste 
 Raymond Bussières as 	Un joueur 
 Léonce Corne as Le garçon

References

Bibliography
 Bertin-Maghit, Jean Pierre. Le cinéma français sous Vichy: les films français de 1940 à 1944. Revue du Cinéma Albatros, 1980.
 Burch, Noël & Sellier, Geneviève. The Battle of the Sexes in French Cinema, 1930–1956. Duke University Press, 2013.
  Ratković, Milan. Bouquinistes of Paris. L'AGE D'HOMME, 2000.

External links 
 

1941 films
1940s French-language films
1941 musical films
French musical films
Films directed by Jean Boyer
Pathé films
Films set in Paris
Films shot at Francoeur Studios
1940s French films